William Hutchings (1879–1948) was an English amateur cricketer.

William Hutchings may also refer to:
William S. Hutchings (1832–1911), math prodigy and mental calculator
William Hutchings (priest) (1835–1912), Anglican priest and author

See also
William Hutchins (disambiguation)